The 1894 Missouri Tigers football team was an American football team that represented the University of Missouri as a member of the Western Interstate University Football Association (WIUFA) during the 1894 college football season. In its second season under head coach Harry Orman Robinson, the team compiled a 4–3 record (2–1 against WIUFA championship) and tied with Nebraska for the conference championship.

Schedule

References

Missouri
Missouri Tigers football seasons
Missouri Tigers football